"Quédate" (English: "Stay") is a song from Pee Wee's debut studio album Yo Soy. It was released as the second promo single from the album debuted live at El Show De Los Sueños in November 2008. It was eventually chosen as the album's official third single, released on December 24, 2009. A remix featuring Sardi was released on January 19, 2010.

Track listing
 Digital download – The Remix
 "Quédate (The Remix)" (featuring Sardi) – 3:46

Charts

References

External links
Pee Wee official website

2008 songs
2009 singles
Pee Wee (singer) songs
Songs written by Pee Wee (singer)
Songs written by Claudia Brant
EMI Records singles